Anthony Licari (April 9, 1921 – July 4, 2013) was a Canadian professional ice hockey player. He played nine games in the National Hockey League (NHL) with the Detroit Red Wings during the 1946–47 season. The rest of his career, which lasted from 1941 to 1955, was mainly spent in various minor leagues.

Playing career
Born in Ottawa, Licari played high school hockey for Ottawa Technical School before joining the Perth Blue Wings junior team of the Ottawa City Hockey League. In 1940, he joined the Guelph Biltmores of the Ontario Hockey Association for one season. Licari turned professional in 1941 with the Dallas Texans of the American Hockey Association. World War II interrupted his professional career and he enlisted in the RCAF. While in the RCAF, he was able to continue play in senior hockey, playing for the Ottawa RCAF, Vancouver RCAF and Ottawa Equipment Depot teams.

After the war, he played exhibition matches with the Wembley Lions in England. In 1946, Licari joined the Indianapolis Capitals of the American Hockey League (AHL). His play earned him a call-up to the NHL Red Wings where he played for nine games, scoring one assist. After the nine games, Licari returned to the minors. After two further seasons with Indianapolis, he was traded by Detroit to Chicago, where he played with their AHL affiliate St. Louis Flyers for one season in 1948–49. He left the AHL ranks, and returned to senior hockey with the Ottawa RCAF Flyers for two seasons. He also played with the Ottawa Senators of the Quebec Senior Hockey League (QSHL) in 1950.

In 1951, he moved to England to join the Harringay Racers where he played professionally for three seasons. Licari was a member of the Racers' Autumn Cup winners in 1952. He returned to Canada and played one more season of senior hockey for the Pembroke Lumber Kings of the Northern Ontario Hockey Association before hanging them up.

Licari died on July 4, 2013, at a hospital in Ottawa.

Career statistics

Regular season and playoffs

References

External links 
 

1921 births
2013 deaths
Canadian expatriates in the United States
Canadian people of Italian descent
Canadian ice hockey right wingers
Canadian military personnel of World War II
Dallas Texans (AHA) players
Detroit Red Wings players
Guelph Biltmore Mad Hatters players
Harringay Racers players
Ice hockey people from Ottawa
Indianapolis Capitals players
Ottawa Senators (QSHL) players
St. Louis Flyers players